Fiona Watt,  (born 28 March 1956) is a British scientist who is internationally known for her contributions to the field of stem cell biology. In the 1980s, when the field was in its infancy, she highlighted key characteristics of stem cells and their environment that laid the foundation for much present day research. She is currently director of the Centre for Stem Cells & Regenerative Medicine at King's College London, and Executive Chair of the Medical Research Council (United Kingdom) (MRC), the first woman to lead the MRC since its foundation in 1913.
On 13 July 2021 she was appointed as the new Director of the European Molecular Biology Organization (EMBO).

Early life and education
Watt was born on 28 March 1956 in Edinburgh, Scotland. Her father was a dental surgeon who combined his clinical work with an active research programme. Her family were members of the Church of Scotland. Her younger sister, Wendy, died in 1982. Fiona Watt knew she wanted to be a scientist from a very young age.

Watt obtained her Bachelor of Arts degree in Natural Sciences in 1976, and her master's degree in 1979, both at Murray Edwards College, University of Cambridge. She also obtained her Doctor of Philosophy degree from the Sir William Dunn School of Pathology, University of Oxford in 1979, supervised by Henry Harris with a thesis on ''Microtubule-organizing centres in cells in culture and in hybrids derived from them'.

Career
After her PhD, Watt completed a two-year postdoctoral research positions at the Massachusetts Institute of Technology (MIT), US, with Dr. Howard Green. Upon returning to the UK, she founded her first lab at the Kennedy Institute of Rheumatology in London where she became Head of the Molecular Cell Biology Laboratory. In 1987 she relocated to the Cancer Research UK London Research Institute (now part of the Francis Crick Institute) where she served as Head of the Keratinocyte Laboratory. From 2007 to 2012 she worked in Cambridge, where she helped to establish the Cambridge Cancer Research UK Institute and the Wellcome Trust Centre for Stem Cell Research. She was a Fellow of St John’s College and the first Herchel Smith Professor of Molecular Genetics at Cambridge University.

Research
Watt’s major research contribution has been to elucidate how the outer covering of mammalian skin, the epidermis, is maintained through self-renewal of stem cells and terminal differentiation of their progeny. Using cultured human epidermis and genetically modified mice, she pioneered the identification of stem cell populations and elucidated the roles of integrin, Notch, Wnt and receptor tyrosine kinase signalling in regulating their behavior. She identified the first marker, integrin extracellular matrix (ECM) receptors, that could be used to isolate epidermal stem cells – researchers have subsequently found that this marker enriches for stem cells in a wide range of tissues. In addition, others have amply confirmed her original concept that the ECM is a key component of the stem cell niche.

Her lab's research has also shown that the interplay between diverse intrinsic and extrinsic signals is central to determining cell fate, identified different sensing mechanisms and downstream signalling pathways, and elucidated the nature of the switch between stem cells and differentiated cells.

A pioneer of single cell gene expression profiling, she demonstrated that different human epidermal stem cell states are not stochastic but reflect the existence of stem cell subpopulations that had not been identified previously. By demonstrating the existence of functionally distinct skin fibroblast lineages she has opened the way for new strategies to treat scarring and fibrosis.

Fiona Watt’s work has resulted in new insights into how epidermal deregulation leads to tumor formation, including the roles played by differentiated cells, bacteria and immune cells. She uncovered new mechanisms by which integrins contribute to cancer, including the first tumour-associated integrin mutation. She also identified the first Wnt-inhibitory mutation that stimulates tumour formation. The generality of her observations has been confirmed in other solid tumours. In recent years she has become increasingly interested in the relationship between genetic variants and cellular behaviour.

Leadership

Watt has played a key role in promoting UK government investment in stem cell research, for example as specialist adviser to the House of Lords Science and Technology Committee. She is past-president of the British Society for Cell Biology and the International Society for Stem Cell Research (ISSCR). She has served as Editor-in-Chief of Journal of Cell Science for 20 years and then as a founding Deputy Editor of eLife. Fiona Watt is a vocal advocate for women in science. In a series of articles and interviews with women scientists (2004-2005) she examined the struggles women face in 'getting to the top'.

At the Medical Research Council she launched a programme to enable full-time clinicians to participate in research; worked with and engaged Black and Minority Ethnic PhD students to identify new ways to support their academic careers; and developed new initiatives in multi-morbidity, adolescent mental health and pain. In 2020, Watt spearheaded efforts to fund coronavirus research, helping to ensure that the first awards from UKRI/DHSC were made just as the scale of the pandemic was becoming apparent. During Watt’s tenure as MRC Executive Chair, she oversaw the decision to close the Mammalian Genetics Unit. This strategic decision was decried by over 150 researchers and leading geneticists internationally, including Elizabeth Fisher and Robin Lovell-Badge. Following a Strategic Review in 2019, the MRC Council concluded that in light of scientific advances to create more complex clinically-related mouse models, it was timely to focus on new investments on targeted programmes that are integrated with human disease modelling. Professor Owen Sansom was appointed Director of the new National Mouse Genetics Network. The Medical Research Council invested more than £20 million in the network bringing together a package of challenge-focused research clusters distributed across the UK and a long term partnership with the Mary Lyon Centre at Harwell.
In December 2020 a whistleblowing investigation was triggered by UK Research and Innovation (UKRI) to investigate claims that Watt had acted in a bullying manner. The investigation was completed in May 2021 and concluded there was a need to take action against Watt. UKRI said it accepted the investigation’s findings and that "appropriate action has been taken". Watt offered written apologies for her behavior to multiple individuals.

Following the whistleblowing investigation, Watt remained in post until her current term as MRC Executive Chair ended in early 2022. She then took up her new position as director of the European Molecular Biology Organization. As a result of the outcome of this whistle blowing investigation, in December 2021 Watt was blocked from applying to the biomedical research funder Wellcome for 12 months and is required to hand over management of her existing grants to colleagues.

Awards and honours
Watt is a Member of the European Molecular Biology Organization (1999), Fellow of the Academy of Medical Sciences (2000) and a Fellow of the Royal Society (2003). 
She was elected an Honorary Foreign Member of the American Academy of Arts and Sciences in 2008 and was awarded the Hunterian Society Medal in 2015. She is a Doctor Honoris Causa of the Universidad Autonoma de Madrid (2016). She won the American Society for Cell Biology (ASCB) Women in Cell Biology Senior Award in 2008 and the FEBS/EMBO Women in Science Award in 2016. She was elected an Honorary Member of Society for Investigative Dermatology (2018) and Honorary Fellow, British Pharmacological Society (2019). She is a Foreign Associate of the National Academy of Sciences (2019). She is a member of several advisory boards, including the European Molecular Biology Laboratory (EMBL) Scientific Advisory Committee (SAC) and the Howard Hughes Medical Institute Medical Advisory Board. She won the inaugural Suffrage Science award in 2011.

References

External links
Cancer Research UK Cambridge Research Institute
Stem Cells and Human Health

British women scientists
Female Fellows of the Royal Society
Living people
Alumni of the University of Oxford
Wellcome Trust
Place of birth missing (living people)
Fellows of the Royal Society
1956 births
Foreign associates of the National Academy of Sciences
Francis Crick Institute alumni